The Walt Disney Company Latin America is one of The Walt Disney Company's international divisions. It is responsible for the Disney brand and its businesses throughout the region. It has offices in Argentina, Brazil, Mexico and Miami.

The company owns and operates the Latin American versions of Disney Channel, Disney Junior, ESPN and Radio Disney. The Walt Disney Company Latin America also produces content as well with other media companies.

Assets

Home video and Television production companies 
Patagonik Film Group (30%)
Star Distribution (formerly Buena Vista International Latín America)
Star Original Productions (formerly Buena Vista Original Productions (2019-2021) and Fox Producciones Originales (2015-2021))

TV channels 
Baby TV
Cinecanal
Disney Channel
Disney Junior (except Brazil)
 ESPN
 Latin America: ESPN, ESPN 2, ESPN 3, ESPN 4, ESPN Extra
 Argentina: ESPN Premium
 Brazil: ESPN, ESPN 2, ESPN 3, ESPN 4, ESPN Extra
 Caribbean: ESPN, ESPN 2
Fox Sports
Fox Sports 1 (Chile), Fox Sports 2 (Latin America) and Fox Sports 3 (Latin America except Brazil)
FX
National Geographic
Rede Telecine (with Globosat, Universal Pictures, Paramount Pictures and MGM. Only distribution)
 Megapix
 Telecine Action, Telecine Cult, Telecine Fun, Telecine Pipoca, Telecine Premium, Telecine Touch
Star Channel

Streaming services 
 Disney+
 Star+
 ESPN App

Radio networks and stations 
Radio Disney Latin America
LRL301 Radio Disney (4.75%; shares owned by The Walt Disney Company Argentina).
Rádio Disney Brasil (29%)

Former assets 
 Disney Junior Brazil (formerly Playhouse Disney) – closed on April 1, 2022
Disney XD (formerly Fox Kids; later Jetix) – closed on April 1, 2022
 Fox Sports Argentina – sold to Mediapro in 2022
 Fox Sports Mexico – sold to Grupo Multimedia Lauman in 2021
 FXM Latin America – closed on April 1, 2022
 Nat Geo Wild – closed on April 1, 2022
 Nat Geo Kids – closed on April 1, 2022
 TeleColombia – sold to ViacomCBS Networks Americas owned by ViacomCBS in 2021
 Buena Vista International Latin America – retired and replaced by Star Distribution in early 2022
 Buena Vista Original Productions – renamed to Star Original Productions on May 19, 2021
 Star Life (formerly Fox Life) – closed on April 1, 2022, replaced by Cinecanal (for Brazil)
 Star Premium (formerly Fox Premium) – closed on January 31, 2022
 Latin America and Caribbean: Star Action, Star Cinema, Star Classics, Star Comedy, Star Fun, Star Hits, Star Series
 Brazil: Star Hits, Star Hits 2

References

External links 
DisneyLatino.com
Disney.com.br
ESPNDeportes.com
The Walt Disney Company
Official YouTube Account

Companies based in Buenos Aires
Mass media companies of Argentina
The Walt Disney Company subsidiaries
Companies established in 1943
Mass media companies established in 1943
1943 establishments in Argentina
Television networks in Argentina
Mass media in Pilar, Buenos Aires